The Bangladesh Securities and Exchange Commission (BSEC) is the regulator of the capital market of Bangladesh, comprising Dhaka Stock Exchange (DSE) and Chittagong Stock Exchange (CSE). The commission is a statutory body and attached to the Ministry of Finance. The current chairman of the commission is Shibli Rubayat Ul Islam.

History
BSEC was established on 8 June 1993 under the Securities and Exchange Commission Act, 1993. Before the commission, the market were regulated under the Capital Issues Act 1947. The chairman and members of the commission are appointed by the government and have overall responsibility to administer securities legislation. The commission, at present, has four full-time members, excluding the chairman.  The commission is a statutory body and attached to the Ministry of Finance. It works closely with Central Depository Bangladesh Limited.

Initially named simply as the Securities and Exchange Commission, on 10 December 2012, its name was officially changed to the Bangladesh Securities and Exchange Commission.

During the 2011 Bangladesh share market scam the BSEC withdrew various directives given earlier to help stabilize trading at the Dhaka Stock Exchange and was criticized by some commentators for its actions during the subsequent crash.

In 2017, M Khairul Hossain, chairman of Bangladesh Securities and Exchange Commission, announced plans to establish an intelligence unit of the commission.

Bangladesh Academy for Securities Market was established in 2019 as the academic unit of Bangladesh Securities and Exchange Commission with Toufic Ahmad Choudhury as the first Director General.

Two professors of the University of Dhaka, Shaikh Shamsuddin Ahmed and Mizanur Rahman, were appointed commissioners of Bangladesh Securities and Exchange Commission on 20 May 2020.

In 2021, Bangladesh Securities and Exchange Commission announced it is investigating Padma Bank following a complaint by Mohiuddin Khan Alamgir, founding chairman of the bank, and letter against him from the bank.

Bangladesh Securities and Exchange Commission approved Bashundhara Group's request to purchase a 25 percent stake in the Chittagong Stock Exchange. Under the Digital Security Act, Bangladesh Securities and Exchange Commission was identified as a critical information infrastructure which restricts the publics access to information from the organisation. The commission ordered Tamha Securities to be liquidated to pay back clients whose investment was embezzled by the firm. Professor Rumana Islam of the University of Dhaka was appointed the first female commissioner in May 2022 replacing Khondoker Kamaluzzaman.

Functions
Regulating the business of the Stock Exchanges or any other securities markets. 
Registering and regulating the business of stock-brokers, sub-brokers, share transfer agents, merchant bankers and managers of issues, trustee of trust deeds, registrar of an issue, underwriters, portfolio managers, investment advisers and other intermediaries in the securities market. 
Registering, monitoring and regulating of collective investment scheme including all forms of mutual funds. 
Monitoring and regulating all authorized self-regulatory organizations in the securities market. 
Prohibiting fraudulent and unfair trade practices relating to securities trading in any securities market. 
Promoting investors’ education and providing training for intermediaries of the securities market. 
Prohibiting insider trading in securities. 
Regulating the substantial acquisition of shares and take-over of companies. 
Undertaking investigation and inspection, inquiries and audit of any issuer or dealer of securities, the Stock Exchanges and intermediaries and any self-regulatory organization in the securities market. 
Conducting research and publishing information.

References

External links
http://www.secbd.org
http://www.ekushey-tv.com

Bangladesh
Government agencies of Bangladesh
Securities and exchange commissions
1993 establishments in Bangladesh
Regulators of Bangladesh